Bangi may refer to:
 Bangi, East Azerbaijan
 Bangi, Hormozgan